Newbern is a town in Hale County, Alabama, United States. It incorporated in 1854. The population as of the 2010 U.S. Census was 186, down from 231 in 2000. This was its lowest population since the census reported figures for the community beginning in 1880. It is part of the Tuscaloosa, Alabama Metropolitan Statistical Area. The community was named for New Bern, North Carolina. It is in the Central Standard Time Zone. The Rural Studio of Auburn University is based in Newbern; its architecture student practitioners work under the supervision of faculty on designing and building affordable housing and similar projects to support the population of rural areas in Alabama.

Geography
Newbern is located at  (32.594818, -87.535431).

The town is located in the geographic region known as the Black Belt, related to the fertile soil which attracted developers of cotton plantations in the antebellum years, and also to the population of enslaved African Americans who worked at those sites. Many areas of the rural Black Belt are still majority African American in population.

Demographics

As of the census of 2000, there were 231 people, 91 households, and 59 families residing in the town. The racial makeup of the town was 22.94% White and 77.06% Black or African American.

There were 91 households, out of which 38.5% had children under the age of 18 living with them, 37.4% were married couples living together, 25.3% had a female householder with no husband present, and 34.1% were non-families. 33.0% of all households were made up of individuals, and 19.8% had someone living alone who was 65 years of age or older. The average household size was 2.54 and the average family size was 3.28.

In the town, the population was spread out, with 32.0% under the age of 18, 6.5% from 18 to 24, 26.0% from 25 to 44, 18.6% from 45 to 64, and 16.9% who were 65 years of age or older. The median age was 34 years. For every 100 females, there were 83.3 males. For every 100 females age 18 and over, there were 80.5 males.

The median income for a household in the town was $20,682, and the median income for a family was $31,042. Males had a median income of $25,625 versus $11,875 for females. The per capita income for the town was $9,476. About 17.5% of families and 31.4% of the population were below the poverty line, including 40.0% of those under the age of eighteen and 33.3% of those 65 or over.

Notable people
Frank Allen, former Major League Baseball player
Anthony Bryant, former NFL player
Herb Jones, NBA player
Henry Watson, Jr., owned a cotton plantation in Newbern

Gallery
The below photographs were taken in Newbern as part of the Historic American Buildings Survey in the 1930s:

References

External links
 Rural Studio

Towns in Hale County, Alabama
Towns in Alabama
Tuscaloosa, Alabama metropolitan area
1854 establishments in Alabama
Populated places established in 1854